Hawley Harvey Crippen (September 11, 1862 – November 23, 1910), usually known as Dr. Crippen, was an American homeopath, ear and eye specialist and medicine dispenser. He was hanged in Pentonville Prison in London for the murder of his wife Cora Henrietta Crippen. Crippen was one of the first criminals to be captured with the aid of wireless telegraphy.

Early life and career
Crippen was born in Coldwater, Michigan, the only surviving child to Andresse Skinner (1835-1909) and Myron Augustus Crippen (1835-1910), a merchant. Crippen studied first at the University of Michigan Homeopathic Medical School and graduated from the Cleveland Homeopathic Medical College in 1884. Crippen's first wife, Charlotte, died of a stroke in 1892, and Crippen entrusted his parents, living in San Jose, California, with the care of his son, Hawley Otto (1889-1974).

Having qualified as a homeopath, Crippen started to practice in New York, where in 1894 he married his second wife, Corrine "Cora" Turner, who performed under the stage name Belle Elmore, and was born Kunigunde Mackamotski to a German mother and a Polish-Russian father. She was a would-be music hall singer who openly had affairs. In 1894, Crippen started working for Dr Munyon's, a homeopathic pharmaceutical company.

In 1897, Crippen moved to England with his wife, although his US medical qualifications were not sufficient to allow him to practise as a doctor in the UK. As Crippen continued working as a distributor of patent medicines, Cora socialised with a number of variety players of the time, including Lil Hawthorne of The Hawthorne Sisters and Lil's husband/manager, John Nash.

Crippen was sacked by Munyon's in 1899 for spending too much time managing his wife's stage career. He became manager of Drouet's Institution for the Deaf, where he hired Ethel Le Neve, a young typist, in 1900. By 1905, the two were having an affair. After living at various addresses in London, the Crippens finally moved in 1905 to 39 Hilldrop Crescent, Camden Road, Holloway, London, where they took in lodgers to augment Crippen's meagre income. Cora had an affair with one of these lodgers, and in turn, Crippen took Le Neve as his mistress in 1908.

Murder and disappearance

After a party at their home on 31 January 1910, Cora disappeared. Hawley Crippen claimed that she had returned to the United States and later added that she had died and had been cremated in California. Meanwhile, his lover, Ethel "Le Neve" Neave, moved into Hilldrop Crescent and began openly wearing Cora's clothes and jewelry.

Police first heard of Cora's disappearance from her friend, the strongwoman Kate Williams, better known as Vulcana, but began to take the matter more seriously when asked to investigate by a personal friend of Scotland Yard Superintendent Frank Froest, John Nash and his entertainer wife, Lil Hawthorne. The house was searched, but nothing was found, and Crippen was interviewed by Chief Inspector Walter Dew. Crippen admitted that he had fabricated the story about his wife having died and explained that he had made it up in order to avoid any personal embarrassment because she had in fact left him and fled to America with one of her lovers, a music hall actor named Bruce Miller. After the interview (and a quick search of the house), Dew was satisfied with Crippen's story. However, Crippen and Le Neve did not know this and fled in panic to Brussels, where they spent the night at a hotel. The following day, they went to Antwerp and boarded the Canadian Pacific liner  for Canada.

Their disappearance led the police at Scotland Yard to perform another three searches of the house. During the fourth and final search, they found the torso of a human body buried under the brick floor of the basement. William Willcox (later Sir William Willcox, senior scientific analyst to the Home Office) found traces of the calming drug scopolamine in the torso. The remains were identified as being Cora by a piece of skin from the abdomen; the head, limbs, and skeleton were never recovered. Her remains were later interred at the St Pancras and Islington Cemetery, East Finchley.

Transatlantic arrest

Meanwhile, Crippen and Le Neve were crossing the Atlantic on the Montrose, with Le Neve disguised as a boy. Captain Henry George Kendall recognised the fugitives and, just before steaming beyond the range of his ship-board transmitter, had telegraphist Lawrence Ernest Hughes send a wireless telegram to the British authorities: "Have strong suspicions that Crippen London cellar murderer and accomplice are among saloon passengers. Mustache taken off growing beard. Accomplice dressed as boy. Manner and build undoubtedly a girl." Had Crippen travelled third class, he probably would have escaped Kendall's notice. Dew boarded a faster White Star liner, from Liverpool, arrived in Quebec, Canada, ahead of Crippen, and contacted the Canadian authorities.

As the Montrose entered the St. Lawrence River, Dew came aboard disguised as a pilot. Canada was then still a dominion within the British Empire. If Crippen, an American citizen, had sailed to the United States instead, even if he had been recognised, it would have taken extradition proceedings to bring him to trial. Kendall invited Crippen to meet the pilots as they came aboard. Dew removed his pilot's cap and said, "Good morning, Dr. Crippen. Do you know me? I'm Chief Inspector Dew from Scotland Yard." After a pause, Crippen replied, "Thank God it's over. The suspense has been too great. I couldn't stand it any longer." He then held out his wrists for the handcuffs. Crippen and Le Neve were arrested on board the Montrose on 31 July 1910.

Trial 

Crippen was tried at the Old Bailey before the Lord Chief Justice, Lord Alverstone, on 18 October 1910. The proceedings lasted four days.

The first prosecution witnesses were pathologists. One of them, Bernard Spilsbury, testified they could not identify the torso remains or even discern whether they were male or female. However, Bernard Spilsbury found a piece of skin with what he claimed to be an abdominal scar consistent with Cora's medical history. Large quantities of the toxic compound scopalamine were found in the remains, and Crippen had purchased the drug before the murder from a local chemist.

Crippen's defence, led by Alfred Tobin, maintained that Cora had fled to America with another man named Bruce Miller and that Cora and Hawley had been living at the house only since 1905, suggesting a previous owner of the house was responsible for the placement of the remains. The defence asserted that the abdominal scar identified by pathologist Spilsbury was really just folded tissue, for, among other things, it had hair follicles growing from it, something scar tissue could not have; Spilsbury observed that the sebaceous glands appeared at the ends but not in the middle of the scar.

Other evidence presented by the prosecution included a piece of a man's pyjama top supposedly from a pair Cora had given Crippen a year earlier. The pyjama bottoms were found in Crippen's bedroom, but not the top. The fragment included the manufacturer's label, Jones Bros. Curlers, and bleached hair consistent with Cora's, were found with the remains. Testimony from a Jones Bros. representative, the store that the pyjama top fragment came from, stated that the product was not sold prior to 1908, thus placing the date of manufacture well within the time period of when the Crippens occupied the house and when Cora gave the garment to Hawley the year before in 1909.

Throughout the proceedings and at his sentencing, Crippen showed no remorse for his wife, only concern for his lover's reputation. The jury found Crippen guilty of murder after just 27 minutes of deliberations. Le Neve was charged only with being an accessory after the fact and acquitted.

Although Crippen never gave any reason for killing his wife, several theories have been propounded. One was by the late Victorian and Edwardian barrister Edward Marshall Hall who believed that Crippen was using hyoscine on his wife as a depressant or anaphrodisiac but accidentally gave her an overdose and then panicked when she died. It is said that Hall declined to lead Crippen's defence because another theory was to be propounded.

In 1981, several British newspapers reported that Sir Hugh Rhys Rankin claimed to have met Ethel Le Neve in 1930 in Australia where she told him that Crippen murdered his wife because she had syphilis.

Execution
Crippen was hanged by John Ellis at Pentonville Prison, London at 9 am on Wednesday 23 November 1910.

Le Neve sailed to the United States before settling in Canada finding work as a typist. She returned to Britain in 1915 and died in 1967. At Crippen's request, a photograph of Le Neve was placed in his coffin and buried with him.

Although Crippen's grave in Pentonville's grounds is not marked by a stone, tradition has it that soon after his burial, a rose bush was planted over it. Some of his relatives in Michigan have begun lobbying for his remains to be repatriated to the United States.

Crippen's guilt
Questions have arisen about the investigation, trial and evidence that convicted Crippen in 1910. Dornford Yates, a junior barrister at the original trial, wrote in his memoirs As Berry and I Were Saying, that Lord Alverstone took the very unusual step, at the request of the prosecution, of refusing to give a copy of the sworn affidavit used to issue the arrest warrant to Crippen's defence counsel. The judge without challenge accepted the prosecution's argument that the withholding of the document would not prejudice the accused's case. Yates said he knew why the prosecution did this but – despite the passage of years – refused to disclose why. Yates noted that although Crippen placed the torso in dry quicklime to be destroyed, he did not realise that when it became wet it turned into slaked lime, which is a preservative: a fact that Yates used in the plot of his novel The House That Berry Built.

The American-British crime novelist Raymond Chandler thought it unbelievable that Crippen could be so stupid as to bury his wife's torso under the cellar floor of his home while successfully disposing of her head and limbs.

Another theory is that Crippen was carrying out illegal abortions and the torso was that of one of his patients who died and not his wife.

New scientific evidence
In October 2007, Michigan State University forensic scientist David Foran claimed that mitochondrial DNA evidence showed the remains found beneath Crippen's cellar floor were not those of his wife, Cora Crippen. Researchers used genealogy to identify three living relatives of Cora Crippen (great-nieces). By providing mitochondrial DNA haplotype, researchers were able to  compare their DNA with DNA extracted from a microscope slide containing flesh taken from the torso in Crippen's cellar. The original remains were also tested using a highly sensitive assay of the Y chromosome that found the flesh sample on the slide was male.

The same research team also argued that a scar found on the torso's abdomen, which the original trial's prosecution argued was the same one Mrs. Crippen was known to have, was incorrectly identified. The scientists found hair follicles in the tissue which should not be present in scars (a medical fact which Crippen's defence used at his trial). Their research was published in the August 2010 issue of the Journal of Forensic Sciences.

However, the new scientific evidence for Crippen's innocence has been disputed. In The Times, journalist David Aaronovitch wrote: "As to the body being male, well the American team was using a 'special technique' that is 'very new' and 'done only by this team' and working on a single, century-old slide, described by the team leader as a 'less than optimal sample'". Foran responded by saying "tests showed unequivocally that the remains were male".

Traces of the blonde hair found in curlers at the scene are now preserved in the Metropolitan Police's Crime Museum. Another researcher said they asked to be provided with samples from them for DNA testing, but the request has been denied several times. However, New Scotland Yard was willing to test a hair from the crime scene for a fee, which in turn was rejected by the investigators as "over the top." Researchers hypothesized that the police planted the body parts and particularly the fragment of the pyjama top at the scene to incriminate Crippen. He suggests that Scotland Yard was under tremendous public pressure to find and bring to trial a suspect for this heinous crime. An independent observer points out that the case did not become public until after the remains were found.

In December 2009, the UK's Criminal Cases Review Commission, having reviewed the case, declared that the Court of Appeal will not hear the case to pardon Crippen posthumously.

Media portrayals

 The murder inspired Arthur Machen's 1927 short story "The Islington Mystery", which in turn was adapted as the 1960 Mexican film El Esqueleto de la señora Morales.
 The gang defeated by Elsa Lanchester in the H.G. Wells-scripted crime comedy Blue Bottles (1928) is revealed to be related to the Crippen case.
 It is thought to have inspired the 1935 novel We, the Accused by Ernest Raymond.
 The German 1942 feature film Doctor Crippen stars Rudolf Fernau in the title role.
 The story of Dr. Crippen is retold in the act 1 finale of the 1943 Broadway musical One Touch of Venus.
 The character of Mr. Pugh in the radio drama Under Milk Wood, by Dylan Thomas, is described as sporting a "nicotine-eggyellow weeping walrus Victorian moustache worn thick and long in memory of Doctor Crippen". Throughout the play, he obsessively fantasises with murdering his wife, and attempts to do so.
 A German sequel of Dr. Crippen an Bord was named Dr. Crippen lebt (1957).
 The 1961 Wolf Mankowitz musical Belle at the Strand Theatre in London was based on the case.
 In the 1961 Alfred Hitchcock Presents episode "The Hatbox", accused wife murderer Professor Jarvis mentions Crippen and Landrau to the detective questioning his wife's disappearance.
 The British 1962 feature film Dr. Crippen stars Donald Pleasence in the title role and Samantha Eggar as Le Neve.
 In the 20 December 1965 episode of the BBC sitcom Meet the Wife titled "The Merry Widow", Thora Hird says "Look, If I believed you... Crippen would be innocent."
 The British 1968 film Negatives features Peter McEnery and Glenda Jackson as a couple whose erotic fantasies involve dressing up as Crippen and Ethel le Neve.
 The American TV series Ironside presented an episode (season 2, episode 16, January 23, 1969: "Why the Tuesday Afternoon Bridge Club Met on Thursday") in which a neurotic man assumed Dr. Crippen's identity and committed a similar murder.
 In Carry On Loving, which was made and set in 1970, there is a jokily anachronistic reference to the Crippen case: Peter Butterworth appears in Edwardian costume as 'Dr Crippen', visiting a marriage bureau to seek a third wife, having dispatched both his first two.
 In the 1972 season of Australian TV soap opera, Number 96, a plot line involving the death of Sylvia Vansard (in which her estranged chemist husband and his mistress are the main suspects), deliberately homages the Crippen story. It was referenced in the official synopses provided to the screenwriters.
 In “The Green Door” (1977), s04e02 of the BBC series The Good Life (1975 TV series), the character Tom jokingly references Crippen.
 Kate Bush mentioned Crippen in her 1978 song "Coffee Homeground" about a poisoner – "...pictures of Crippen, lipstick smeared..."
 The 1981 TV series Lady Killers episode "Miss Elmore" covers the case.
 The Crippen saga is the basis for 1982's The False Inspector Dew, a detective novel by Peter Lovesey.
 The 1989 BBC series Shadow of the Noose, about the life of barrister Edward Marshall Hall, includes an abortive attempt on Hall's part to defend Crippen (played by David Hatton).
 Crippen is mentioned several times in the BBC series Coupling, series 1, episode 1, titled “Flushed”, as a running gag and an ongoing argument between Jane and Steve about continuing their relationship.
 John Boyne wrote the 2004 novel Crippen – A Novel of Murder.
 Erik Larson's 2006 book Thunderstruck interwove the story of the murder with the history of Guglielmo Marconi's invention of radio.
 In the BBC Radio 4 series  Old Harry's Game, series 6, episode 3 (2008), Satan mentions Dr Crippen in hell.
 Martin Edwards wrote the 2008 novel Dancing for the Hangman, which re-interprets the case while seeking to adhere to the established evidence.
 The PBS series Secrets of the Dead episode "Executed in Error" (2008) explored new findings in the Crippen case.
 In series 1, episode 5 of the British comedy series Psychoville (2009), Reece Shearsmith plays a waxwork figure that comes to life in a dream. Jack the Ripper mistakes him for Crippen, but he is portraying John Reginald Christie.
 The third installment in the TV series Murder Maps is "Finding Dr. Crippen" (2015). 
 Dan Weatherer's stage play Crippen (2016) explores the life and crimes of Dr. Hawley Crippen while taking into account new evidence and presenting an alternative theory as to who lay buried beneath the cellar floor.
 The cat attached to the Peculiar Crimes Unit in Christopher Fowler’s novels is named “Crippen”.

See also

John Reginald Christie, English serial killer
John George Haigh, English serial killer known as the "Acid Bath Murderer"
Michael Swango, American serial killer
John Tawell, British murderer and the first criminal to be captured with the use of telecommunications technology
Dorothea Waddingham, English nursing home matron and murderer

References

Further reading

Finn, Pat (2016) Unsolved 1910.

External links

 
 
 
 
 
 
 

1862 births
1910 deaths
20th-century executions by England and Wales
20th-century executions of American people
American expatriates in the United Kingdom
American homeopaths
American people executed for murder
American people executed abroad
Executed people from Michigan
Male murderers
People convicted of murder by England and Wales
People from Coldwater, Michigan
1910 murders in the United Kingdom
University of Michigan alumni
1910s murders in London
Uxoricides
1910 in London
Poisoners